Ann E. Weber is the Senior Vice President for Drug Discovery at Kallyope Inc. in New York City. She previously worked with Merck Research Laboratories (MRL), joining the company in 1987 and retiring from the position of Vice President for Lead Optimization Chemistry in 2015. She has helped develop more than 40  drug candidates including FDA-approved treatments for Type 2 diabetes. She has received a number of awards, including the Perkin Medal (2017) and has been inducted into the ACS Division of Medicinal Chemistry’s MEDI Hall of Fame.

Education
Weber grew up in Oshkosh, Wisconsin, the child of a nurse and a doctor.
There she attended Lourdes High School (Oshkosh, Wisconsin), a Catholic school.

Weber earned a B.S. degree in chemistry summa cum laude from the University of Notre Dame (1982) and a Ph.D. degree from Harvard University, where she studied synthetic organic chemistry with David A. Evans. She was the first woman to receive a Ph.D. from his group, in 1987.

Research
Weber joined Merck Research Laboratories (MRL) in Rahway, New Jersey in 1987, retiring in 2015 from the position of Vice President for Lead Optimization Chemistry. In 2016 she joined Kallyope Inc. in New York City as Senior Vice President for Drug Discovery.  Her research areas include the development of ligands for G protein–coupled receptors, Ligand-gated ion channels and enzymes.

During her career in drug discovery and development, she has published more than 80 publications. She is a co-inventor of more than 35 issued US patents. Her work has led to the development of more than 40  drug candidates including FDA-approved treatments for Type 2 diabetes. Other drug candidates target obesity,  atherosclerosis, pain, and urinary incontinence.

Beginning in 1999, Weber led the chemical team for the development of Januvia™ (generic: sitagliptin), a drug that inhibits the dipeptidyl peptidase-4 (DPP-4) enzyme and improves glucose tolerance to treat Type 2 diabetes. Nancy Thornberry led the corresponding biological team for the project. The drug was approved by the FDA in October 2006. Janumet™, a drug combining sitagliptin and metformin was also approved, in April 2007. In 2007, the research team at Merck received the Prix Galien USA award for their work on Januvia™.

Awards
 2017, Perkin Medal, Society of Chemical Industry (American Section)
 2016, MEDI Hall of Fame, ACS Division of Medicinal Chemistry
 2013, Women in STEM honoree, Liberty Science Center (LSC)
 2012-2013, Sylvia M. Stoesser Lecturer in Chemistry, University of Illinois
 2011, Discoverer’s Award, Pharmaceutical Research and Manufacturers of America (PhRMA), with Nancy Thornberry
 2011, Thomas Alva Edison Patent Award, Research and Development Council of New Jersey
 2010, Heroes of Chemistry Award (ACS) with Nancy Thornberry and Joseph Armstrong
 2010, Robert M. Scarborough Award for Excellence in Medicinal Chemistry, American Chemistry Society (ACS)
 2008, Outstanding Women of Science honoree, New Jersey Association for Biomedical Research (NJABR)
 2007, Prix Galien USA award to the Merck research team for Januvia™
 Merck & Co. Director’s Award, the highest honor that Merck confers on its employees

References

External links
 

Living people
Notre Dame College of Arts and Letters alumni
Harvard Graduate School of Arts and Sciences alumni
21st-century American chemists
American women chemists
Year of birth missing (living people)
21st-century American women scientists